Georgios Ballas (born 7 April 2001) is a Greek professional footballer who plays as a forward for Super League 2 club Niki Volos.

References

2001 births
Living people
Greek footballers
Super League Greece players
Super League Greece 2 players
Gamma Ethniki players
Volos N.F.C. players
Niki Volos F.C. players
AEP Kozani F.C. players
Association football forwards
Footballers from Volos